The Regifugium ("Flight of the King") or Fugalia ("Festival of the Flight") was an annual religious festival that took place in ancient Rome every February 24.

History
Varro and Ovid traced the observance to the flight of the last king of Rome, Tarquinius Superbus, in  In his Fasti, Ovid offers the longest surviving account of the observance:
 
Now I must tell of the flight of the King, six days from the end of the month.  The last of the Tarquins possessed the Roman nation, an unjust man, but nevertheless strong in war.

Plutarch holds that the rex sacrorum played as a substitute for the former king of Rome in various religious rituals. The rex held no civic or military role, but nevertheless was bound to offer a public sacrifice in the Comitia on this date. The "flight of the king" was the swift exit the proxy king was required to make from that place of public business. It may be that the two versions are to be reconciled by taking the "flight" of the rex sacrorum as a reenactment of the expulsion of Tarquinius.

See also
 February 24
 Terminalia and other Roman festivals

Notes

References

Ancient Roman festivals
February observances
Abdication